Antarcticimicrobium sediminis is a Gram-negative, aerobic and non-motile  bacterium from the genus of Antarcticimicrobium.

References 

Rhodobacteraceae
Bacteria described in 2020